The Colonial States Athletic Conference men's basketball tournament is the annual conference basketball championship tournament for the NCAA Division III Colonial States Athletic Conference. The tournament has been held annually since 1994. It is a single-elimination tournament and seeding is based on regular season records. 

Prior to 2008, when the CSAC was known as the Pennsylvania Athletic Conference, the event was known as the Pennsylvania Athletic Conference men's basketball tournament.

The winner, declared conference champion, receives the CSAC's automatic bid to the NCAA Men's Division III Basketball Championship.

Results

Pennsylvania Athletic Conference

Colonial States Athletic Conference

Championship records

 Bryn Athyn, Clarks Summit, Saint Elizabeth, and Valley Forge have not yet qualified for the tournament finals
 Eastern and Marywood never reached the finals while members
 Schools highlighted in pink are former members of CSAC

References

NCAA Division III men's basketball conference tournaments
Basketball Tournament, Men's
Recurring sporting events established in 1994